Events from the year 1314 in the Kingdom of Scotland.

Incumbents
Monarch – Robert I

Events
 24 June – Battle of Bannockburn: English forces defeated by smaller army led by Robert the Bruce

Deaths

 24 June – John Comyn IV of Badenoch (born c. 1294)

Undated
 John Balliol, King of Scots from 1292 to 1296 (died in France, born 1249)

See also

 Timeline of Scottish history

References

 
Years of the 14th century in Scotland
Wars of Scottish Independence